Joe Dakota (also known as Spara Joe... e così sia!) is a 1971 Spaghetti Western film directed by Emilio Miraglia.

This 1972 movie should not be confused with a 1957 movie of the same name, Joe Dakota (1957 film) directed by Richard Bartlett, starring Jock Mahoney and Luana Patten (plus Lee van Cleef in a minor role).

Plot
In the 1971 movie, bandits track down a man named Joe who has a map to a fortune of stolen money taken in a bank robbery.

References

External links

1971 films
1970s Italian-language films
Spaghetti Western films
1970s Italian films